United Nations Security Council Resolution 1837 was unanimously adopted on 29 September 2008.

Resolution 
The Security Council this morning extended the terms of office of 4 Appeals Chamber judges as well as those of 10 permanent and 27 ad litem judges of the International Criminal Tribunal for the Former Yugoslavia, until 31 December 2009 or the completion of cases to which they were assigned, if sooner.

Unanimously adopting resolution 1837 (2008) under Chapter VII of the United Nations Charter, the Council also amended article 12, paragraphs 1 and 2 of the Statute of the Tribunal regarding the composition of its Chambers.

See also 
List of United Nations Security Council Resolutions 1801 to 1900 (2008–2009)

References

External links
 
Text of the Resolution at undocs.org

 1837
September 2008 events
 1837